Mangrove Fund is a non-profit organization founded in 2007 to fund Haitian grassroots groups that initiate and support sustainable community development projects in rural Haiti. Its administrative costs are absorbed by its board of directors, and it is all-volunteer.

Mission statement

"To help Haitians build better lives for themselves and their communities by funding efforts and organizations that provide training, tools, and support to the local population with the goal of achieving and maintaining innovative and sustainable solutions to problems that are endured in everyday rural life in Haiti, including lack of education, poor community development, lack of sanitation, and poverty."

History
Mangrove Fund was founded in 2007 in Portland, Oregon by Peter Galen, Bill Pierznik, Mary Pierznik, and Josh Smith in response to the extreme poverty of Haiti, specifically rural Haiti.

Projects
In 2008 Mangrove Fund provided a grant to a Haitian grassroots organization, Vwa Ayiti, "The Voice of Haiti," to aid sanitation development, water purification, and medical outreach in rural communities. The monies enabled the purchase and installation of composting toilets.
Other projects include support of the Zanmite Artists' Center on the Haitian island of Lagonav, 45 miles from the Haitian mainland.

Earthquake response
The Fund has intensified its fund-raising efforts since the January 12, 2010 Haiti earthquake. A fundraising campaign, "Coins for Haiti," was begun by Richelor Pierznik, in Portland, Oregon for immediate emergency aid to the children and caregivers of damaged or destroyed Haitian orphanages.

References

External links
Official Homepage 

Organizations established in 2007
Charities based in Oregon
Development charities based in the United States
Organizations based in Portland, Oregon
Foreign charities operating in Haiti
2007 establishments in Oregon